La Unión is a Cuban village in Cienfuegos Province. It is part of the municipality of Rodas.

Geography
The little village is located between the nearby villages Limones and Ariza, crossed by the state highway "Circuito Sur".

References

Populated places in Cienfuegos Province